Thirumbi Paar is a 1953 Indian Tamil-language film starring Sivaji Ganesan, P. V. Narasimha Bharathi, Pandari Bai, Krishna Kumari and Girija. Produced and directed by T. R. Sundaram of Modern Theatres, the film was written by M. Karunanidhi, who would later become the chief minister of Tamil Nadu. Thirumbi Paar was one of the earliest Tamil films whose dialogues were known to be a political satire on the Indian National Congress, the ruling party then. Sivaji Ganesan played a negative role in the film and received wide acclaim.

Plot 

Parandhaman is a womaniser. A mute girl is married to the much older Punyakodi. Parandhaman seduces the mute girl in the absence of her husband and continues this act with other women. Poomalai is Parandhaman's sister.

Cast 

Male cast
 Sivaji Ganesan as Paranthaman
 Narsimhabharathi as Pandiyan
 Durairaj as Karudan
 Thangavelu as Punyakodi
 Karunanidhi as Kundumani
 Thirupathisami as Mill Proprietor
 Krishnan as Office Boy
 Singam Krishnamoorthi as Bhagavathar
 Chellamuthu as Disciple
 Muthukoothan as Disciple
 Krishnan as Lawyer
 Soundar as Inspector
 Srinivasagopalan as Judge
 Ganapathi as Watchman

Female cast
 Pandari Bai as Poomalai
 Girija as Kumudha
 Krishna Kumari as Bama
 Saraswathi as Usha
 Muthulakshmi as Dumb Girl
 Dhanalakshmi as Thangammal

Production 
Thirumbi Paar was produced and directed by T. R. Sundaram. M. Karunanidhi, the story and dialog writer, was then a prominent member of the Dravida Munnetra Kazhagam (DMK).

The story of the film was inspired from the story of Ahalya. Music for the film was composed by G. Ramanathan. Karunanidhi's witty dialogues were mainly targeted at Indian National Congress, the ruling party. Ganesan, who made his debut through Parasakthi played "anti-hero" roles in most of the films during this period. He continued to act in such roles in films such as Rangoon Radha and Andha Naal, both in 1954. Thirumbi Paar was one of the earliest films written by M. Karunanidhi who belonged to the DMK. Apparently, the film's dialogues were known to be a political satire on Indian National Congress, the ruling party then.

Reception 
The film was a success at the box office. It was lauded mainly for its witty dialogues and political satire. It had a 100-day run in theatres. Sivaji Ganesan's character in—negative role—the film was well received. Years later, in an interview he mentioned Thirumbi Paar was one of the best films  that he had acted in his career. S. Viswanathan in his Industrial Economist described the film as "one of the powerful movies M Karunanidhi [MK] scripted".

Soundtrack 
The music was composed by G. Ramanathan. Lyrics by Bharathidasan & Kannadasan.

References

Bibliography

External links 
 
 

1953 films
1950s Tamil-language films
Films with screenplays by M. Karunanidhi
Films directed by T. R. Sundaram
Films scored by G. Ramanathan